Sand Key may refer to:

Sand Key (barrier island), in Pinellas County, Florida, US
Sand Key Park
Sand Key (reef), a coral reef in the Key West National Wildlife Refuge, Monroe County, Florida, US
Sand Key Light
Sand Key, a barrier island off Tarpon Springs near Anclote Key, Florida, US